Eknath Easwaran (December 17, 1910 October 26, 1999) was an Indian-born spiritual teacher, author and  translator and interpreter of Indian religious texts such as the Bhagavad Gita and the Upanishads.
 
Easwaran was a professor of English literature at the University of Nagpur in India, and in 1959 he came to the United States as a Fulbright Scholar at the University of Minnesota before transferring to the University of California, Berkeley where he taught courses on meditation-the first in the country offering credits. In 1961, Easwaran founded the Blue Mountain Center of Meditation and Nilgiri Press, based in northern California. Nilgiri Press has published over thirty books that he authored.

Easwaran was influenced by Mahatma Gandhi, whom he met when he was a young man. Easwaran developed a method of meditation silent repetition in the mind of memorized inspirational passages from the world's major religious and spiritual traditions which later came to be known as Passage Meditation.

Biography
Eknath Easwaran was born in 1910 in a village in Kerala, India. 
Eknath is his surname, Easwaran his given name. Brought up by his mother, and by his maternal grandmother whom he honored as his spiritual teacher, he was schooled in his native village until the age of sixteen, when he went to attend St. Thomas College, Thrissur, a Catholic college fifty miles away. Here he acquired a deep appreciation of the Christian tradition. He graduated at the University of Nagpur in English and law. He served as Professor of English literature at the University of Nagpur.

In 1959, he came to the United States as a Fulbright Scholar at the University of California, Berkeley.

From 1960 he gave classes on meditation in the San Francisco Bay Area. He met his wife Christine at one of these talks. Together with his wife, he founded the Blue Mountain Center of Meditation in 1961. After a four-year stay in India, he returned to the Bay Area in 1965.

In 1970 he founded Ramagiri Ashram as a community of dedicated followers in Marin County.

He set up a publishing activity, Nilgiri Press, which printed his first book Gandhi The Man, telling the story of Gandhi as a spiritual as well as a political leader. His first major work was his 3-volume commentary on the Bhagavad Gita, the Bhagavad Gita for Daily Living, the first volume of which was printed in 1975 and the last in 1984. His book Meditation on the program of meditation and allied disciplines that he developed first appeared in 1978.

By 2018, Easwaran's methods of spiritual practice had been the focus of two major scientific research programs that had produced thirty refereed research reports.

Published works
Easwaran's written works may be grouped into several major categories—primarily books, but also articles in newspapers and other periodicals. Most of his books have been reviewed by spiritually oriented publications or websites, or by nationally known media such as The New Yorker, or the New York Post.

In addition, a large number of Easwaran's recorded talks have been published in video and audio formats.

Translations

Easwaran's translations of the Bhagavad Gita, the Upanishads, and the Dhammapada (see article) have been critically acclaimed. Religion scholar Huston Smith is cited by the publisher as writing: "No one in modern times is more qualified no, make that 'as qualified' to translate the epochal Classics of Indian Spirituality than Eknath Easwaran. And the reason is clear. It is impossible to get to the heart of those classics unless you live them, and he did live them. My admiration of the man and his works is boundless."
In Buddhism: A Concise Introduction Smith and his coauthor Philip Novak wrote that "Our favorite translation is Eknath Easwaran's The Dhammapada. His Indian heritage, literary gifts, and spiritual sensibilities... here produce a sublime rendering of the words of the Buddha. Verse after verse shimmers with quiet, confident authority. A bonus is the sparkling 70-page introduction to the Buddha's life and teachings."

Since 2009, Easwaran's three translations "have each been the best-selling translations of these scriptures in the USA." In the US in 2016, each of Easwaran's translations outsold the second best-selling translation in its category "by more than 3:1", and the second editions have together sold more than 470,000 copies.

Commentaries

Essence of the Upanishads (see article), originally entitled Dialogue with death: The spiritual psychology of the Katha Upanishad, explains how the Katha Upanishad embraces the key ideas of Indian spirituality within the context of a powerful mythic quest the story of a young hero who ventures into the land of death in search of immortality. "Essence of the Upanishads is a westerner's guide to this vitally important Indian text and its modern relevance to the Indian mindset and spirituality."

In Essence of the Bhagavad Gita, Easwaran places the Gita's teachings in a modern context and comments on the Gita's view of the nature of reality, the illusion of separateness, the search for identity, the meaning of yoga, and how to heal the unconscious. The book views the key message of the Gita as how to resolve our conflicts and live in harmony with the deep unity of life, through the practice of meditation and spiritual disciplines.

In Essence of the Dhammapada, Easwaran comments on the Dhammapada, sayings attributed to the Buddha himself, presenting it as a guide that gives straightforward teachings about spiritual perseverance, progress, and enlightenment.

Books on meditation

His book Passage Meditation (original title Meditation) describes the Eight Point Program that Easwaran developed, while his book Conquest of Mind goes further into the practice of these disciplines in daily life. Timeless Wisdom is a companion book to Passage Meditation and contains passages for meditation drawn from across the world's spiritual traditions. His book Mantram Handbook: a practical guide to choosing your mantram and calming your mind addresses The Mantram, the second point in the program.

His book Strength in the Storm is an introduction to The Mantram, containing many stories and practical examples to help the reader learn how to harness the inner resources for dealing with challenges in daily living. His book Take Your Time explores "Slowing Down" and "One-Pointed Attention" in daily lives. Renewal is a pocket book of short readings on themes such as loving relationships, raising children, living simply, and aging wisely; Patience, the second in the pocket book series, shows how to cultivate Patience "the ornament of the brave" at any age. Other (older) books describe various aspects of leading a spiritual life: Climbing the Blue Mountain, Compassionate Universe, and Undiscovered Country.

Daily readers and reference

God Makes the Rivers to Flow is an anthology of writings from the sacred literature of the world, selected by Easwaran as useful for meditation. A larger (and earlier) version of Timeless Wisdom, it contains dozens of passages from diverse traditions, and identifies passages for particular stages in life, such as caregiving, families with small children, death and dying, grief and loss, and for building positive qualities such as patience, courage, devotion to God, and putting others first. Words to Live By is a set of daily readings with Easwaran's commentary on applying the reading to daily life.

The Bhagavad Gita for Daily Living
The Bhagavad Gita for Daily Living is a manual for living a spiritual life, comprising a verse-by-verse commentary on India's timeless scripture the Bhagavad Gita. The work is in three volumes, published in 1975, 1979 and 1984 respectively, in hardcover and later also in paperback. When the first paperbacks were published the volumes were given new subtitles: the End of Sorrow; Like a Thousand Suns; and To Love is To Know Me.

In 2020 the three-volume set was reissued as a second edition, and as a single-volume ebook.

In Volume 1 (the first six chapters of the Gita) Easwaran explains how readers can begin to transform themselves, even as householders engaged in busy lives. In Volume 2 (the next six chapters) Easwaran addresses the seeming divide between scientific knowledge and spiritual wisdom, and explains how the concept of the unity of life can help people in all their relationships. In Volume 3 (the final six chapters) he makes the connection between the Self within and the Reality underlying all creation – and how to make a difference to heal the environment and establish peace in the world.

Spiritual biographies

Gandhi the Man traces how Mohandas Gandhi transformed himself into one of the world's great spiritual leaders.

Nonviolent Soldier of Islam is the life story of Khan Abdul Ghaffar Khan, a Pathan (or Pushtun) of Afghanistan and a devout Muslim, who raised the first nonviolent army in history to gain Indian independence from British colonial rule. This book was favorably discussed in The New Yorker. The book also inspired filmmaker and writer T.C. McLuhan, daughter of Canadian media theorist Marshall McLuhan, to make the film The Frontier Gandhi: Badshah Khan, a Torch for Peace, which won the 2009 Black Pearl Award for Best Documentary Film.

Commentaries on Christian literature

Original Goodness (see article) is a commentary on the Beatitudes. Love Never Faileth (see article) is a commentary on the writings of St Francis, St Paul, St Augustine, and Mother Teresa. Seeing with the Eyes of Love (see article) is a commentary on The Imitation of Christ.

Newspapers and other periodicals
In the 1980s and 1990s, Easwaran published a variety of commentaries on public events in prominent periodicals, especially 
The Christian Science Monitor,
and also in The New York Times, 
elsewhere in the US,
and internationally.
He also wrote numerous commentaries that appeared in the Little Lamp (1961–1995), and in Blue Mountain (1990–present), quarterly journals published by the meditation center that he founded. In the 1960s, Easwaran published articles in other spiritual journals, such as the Mountain Path, published by Sri Ramana Maharshi's ashram.
Before coming to the US in 1959, Easwaran contributed short stories and other writings to literary anthologies, and to magazines such as The Illustrated Weekly of India.

Video and audio
Many of Easwaran's recorded talks have been published in video and audio formats.

Several dozen of Easwaran's talks have been published as video DVDs, and now as downloadable MP4s as a free subscription from the Blue Mountain Center. 
Before publication as DVDs, videos of Easwaran's talks were first released in VHS videotape format.
Some talks are published in downloadable audio/MP3 formats.
Instructions for meditation by Easwaran have been published in audio form as CDs. Some of Easwaran's talks were earlier published as cassette tapes or LP records. 
Magazines have reviewed some of Easwaran's published talks, both audio
and video,
since the 1990s.

Several of Easwaran's written works, including Essence of the Upanishads, Passage Meditation – A Complete Spiritual Practice,  The Bhagavad Gita, The Dhammapada and Gandhi the Man, have been published as audio books, as voice-recorded by the British actor Paul Bazely, and also the philosopher Jacob Needleman

Eight-point program

Easwaran's program for spiritual growth consists of eight points, and is described comprehensively in his book Passage Meditation A Complete Spiritual Practice (originally published in 1978 as Meditation). Each point had a dedicated chapter:
 Meditation: Silent repetition upon memorized inspirational passages from one of the world's great religions. Practiced for one-half hour each morning.
 The Mantram: silent repetition of a mantram, holy name or hallowed phrase from one of the world's great religions.
 Slowing Down: set priorities to reduce stress and hurry
 One-Pointed Attention: give full concentration to whatever matter is currently at hand
 Training the Senses: enjoy simple pleasures in order to avoid craving for unhealthy excess
 Putting Others First: denounce selfishness and cultivating altruism
 Spiritual Companionship: practice meditation in the company of others
 Reading the Mystics: draw inspiration from the writings of the scriptures of all religions.

Other influence
A variety of influences of Easwaran's life and work have been documented. Easwaran's students, inspired in part by his teachings about compassion and stewardship for the environment, published a well-known vegetarian cookbook entitled Laurel's Kitchen (1976), later republished in revised form as The New Laurel's Kitchen (1986). The book contained extensive nutritional information from a scientific point of view, and sold more than a million copies.

Easwaran's teachings or practices have sometimes been taught as part of traditional college courses,
or as tools for self-management by health professionals.

Outside of the US, Easwaran's life and teachings were profiled, along with those of a variety of other spiritual teachers, in a book published in India entitled Meditation Masters and their Insights.

Easwaran's words have been included in collections of wisdom teachings, such as ones recently published by Chang (2006) and Parachin (2011).
Quotations from Easwaran's translations have been used many times by both scholarly and popular writers.
Easwaran's other writings have also been quoted by various types of authors, including writers of novels and short stories,
popular spirituality,
and articles on management theory.
Psychiatrist Aaron Beck and his colleagues quoted from Easwaran's commentary on the Katha Upanishad.
The NAPRA ReView wrote that "The volume of [Easwaran's] work and the quality of his discourse suggest a man who has had a profound impact on the spiritual lives of many."

Easwaran's method of passage meditation was followed by the poet Robert Lax. Near the end of his life, Lax's only reading each day was from Easwaran's book Words to Live By.

New Hampshire State Representative Latha Mangipudi reported having given then-Senator Barack Obama a copy of Easwaran's book Gandhi the Man in December 2006.

Easwaran has been listed in reference works on spiritual and religious leaders.

In his survey of commentaries on the Bhagavad Gita, Nadkarni described Easwaran as "respected worldwide as one of the most profound writers and orators on religion and spirituality".

Bibliography
Easwaran's books, initially written in English, have also been translated into more than 20 other languages, and published in non-US editions by indigenous (non-US) publishers. Languages in which his books are currently in print include Bahasa Indonesian, Bulgarian, Czech, Dutch, English, French, German, Greek, Hungarian, Italian, Japanese, Korean, Lithuanian, Portuguese, Romanian, Slovenian, Spanish, and Telugu. His books have also been translated into Chinese (PRC).

The Bhagavad Gita (Translation and Introduction), 2007, e-book:
The Dhammapada (Translation and Introduction), 2007, e-book:
[https://books.google.com/books?id=CcnJAAAAQBAJ Upanishads (Translation and Introduction)], 2007, e-book:Passage meditation A complete spiritual practice: Train your mind and find a life that fulfills (see article), 2016, e-book:, a comprehensively revised edition ofPassage Meditation: Bringing the Deep Wisdom of the Heart into Daily Life, 2008, a republication ofMeditation: Commonsense Directions for an Uncommon Life, 1978 (also a 2nd edition, 1991)Conquest of Mind: Take charge of your thoughts & reshape your life through meditation, 3rd ed. 2010, e-book:The Bhagavad Gita for Daily Living (Translation and Verse by Verse Commentary):
First Edition (1975–1984):The End of Sorrow (The Bhagavad Gita for Daily Living, Vol. 1), 1975, 1993, e-book:Like a Thousand Suns (The Bhagavad Gita for Daily Living, Vol. 2), 1979, 1993, e-book:To Love Is to Know Me (Bhagavad Gita for Daily Living, Vol. 3), 1984, 1993, e-book:
Second Edition (2020):The Bhagavad Gita for Daily Living Volume One (Chapters 1–6: The End of Sorrow), 2020 (paperback , hardcover )The Bhagavad Gita for Daily Living Volume Two (Chapters 7–12: Like a Thousand Suns), 2020 (paperback , hardcover )The Bhagavad Gita for Daily Living Volume Three (Chapters 13–18: To Love Is to Know Me), 2020 (paperback , hardcover )The Bhagavad Gita for Daily Living Volumes 1–3, 2020 e-book
Essence of the Bhagavad Gita: A Contemporary Guide to Yoga, Meditation and Indian Philosophy, 2011, e-book: 
Essence of the Dhammapada: The Buddha's Call to Nirvana, 2013 Essence of the Upanishads: A Key to Indian Spirituality (see article), 2009, e-book:, originally published as:Dialogue With Death: A Journey Through Consciousness, 1992God Makes the Rivers to Flow: An anthology of the world's sacred poetry & prose (see article), 2009, e-book:, a larger version of:Timeless Wisdom: Passages for meditation from the world's saints & sages (see article), 2008, e-book:Climbing the Blue Mountain: A Guide for the Spiritual Journey, 1992, 2014, e-book:, previously published as:Supreme Ambition: Life's Goals and How to Reach ItLove Never Faileth: Commentaries on texts from St. Francis, St. Paul, St. Augustine & Mother Teresa, with introductions by Carol L. Flinders, 1993, e-book:Seeing With the Eyes of Love: A Commentary on a text from the Imitation of Christ, 1993, e-book:Original Goodness: A Commentary on the Beatitudes, 1996, e-book:The Undiscovered Country: Exploring the Promise of Death, 1996, e-book:Words to Live By: Inspiration for Every Day, 1996, reissued as Words to Live By: Short Readings of Daily Wisdom, 2010, e-book:Gandhi the Man: How One Man Changed Himself to Change the World (see article), 2011, e-book:Nonviolent Soldier of Islam: Badshah Khan, A Man to Match His Mountains (see article), e-book:, previously published asA man to match his mountains: Badshah Khan, nonviolent soldier of Islam (1984)A Higher Image, 2002Love Alters Not, 2002The Compassionate Universe, 1989, 1993, e-book:Patience: A Little Book of Inner Strength, 2010, e-book:Renewal: A Little Book of Courage and Hope, 2009, e-book:, a re-edited and republished version of:Your Life Is Your Message: Finding Harmony With Yourself, Others, and the EarthStrength in the Storm: Transform Stress, Live in Balance and Find Peace of Mind, 2005, 2013, e-book:Take Your Time: The Wisdom of Slowing Down, e-book:The Constant Companion, e-book:, previously published as:Thousand Names of VishnuThe Mantram Handbook (see article), e-book:, previously issued as:The Unstruck Bell: Powerful New Strategies for Using a MantramA More Ardent Fire: From Everyday Love to Love of God, e-book:Kabir: Stages of DesireSaint Francis: Becoming an Instrument of PeaceWith My Love and Blessings: The Teaching Years, 1966–1999, in Photographs & His Own WordsThe Monkey and the Mango: Stories of My Granny (Illustrated by Ilka Jerabek), 1996
From 2011, a number of Easwaran's books and articles were excerpted and republished as the series of short ebooks "Easwaran Inspirations":How to Meditate, the instructions in meditation from Passage MeditationHow to Understand Death, excerpted from "The Undiscovered Country"How to Find Happiness, based on two articles from Easwaran's Blue Mountain JournalLearning to Love, excerpted from a number of booksWhat is Karma, the chapter on Karma from Essence of the Dhammapada: The Buddha's Call to Nirvana
Contributions to works by others include:
 (contribution to edited volume)
Eknath Easwaran (1991). "Working for others [reprinted from the Little Lamp, vol. 22, no. 3, Autumn 1982]" (pp 72–84) in 
Eknath Easwaran (1996). Preface (pp. ix–x) to  

Preface to The Essential Gandhi by Louis Fischer (2002, 2nd edition). New York: Vintage.
Preface to In Quest of God: The Saga of an Extraordinary Pilgrimage'' by Swami Ramdas (2002, 2nd American edition). San Diego, CA: Blue Dove Foundation.

See also
 Perennial philosophy

References

External links

Easwaran biography (text)
Quietly Changing the World (4-part video biography, 1959—1979) 
Instructions in passage meditation
Quotations from Easwaran's translation of the Bhagavad Gita

Eknath Easwaran
Eknath Easwaran
Indian emigrants to the United States
People from the San Francisco Bay Area
St. Thomas College, Thrissur alumni
Rashtrasant Tukadoji Maharaj Nagpur University alumni
Academic staff of Rashtrasant Tukadoji Maharaj Nagpur University
American Hindus
Writers from Thrissur
Malayali people
Malayalam-language writers
20th-century Hindu philosophers and theologians
20th-century American non-fiction writers
American spiritual writers
American translators
Translators to English
Translators of the Bhagavad Gita
20th-century Indian translators
American spiritual teachers
Indian spiritual teachers
Religion in the San Francisco Bay Area
Scholars of Hinduism